Rune Ewert Öberg (26 December 1922 – 17 April 2002) was a Swedish water polo player who competed in the 1948 Summer Olympics. In 1948 he was part of the Swedish team which finished fifth in the water polo tournament. He played six matches.

See also
 Sweden men's Olympic water polo team records and statistics
 List of men's Olympic water polo tournament goalkeepers

References

External links
 

1922 births
2002 deaths
Swedish male water polo players
Water polo goalkeepers
Olympic water polo players of Sweden
Water polo players at the 1948 Summer Olympics